The Grand Psychotic Castle is an EP and the second release by Norwegian symphonic black metal solo project Tartaros. It was released in 1997 through Necropolis Records.

Critical reception 

Chronicles of Chaos, while complimenting the album's "dark, ominous atmosphere", wrote that it is "damaged somewhat by a constantly intruding drum machine that does nothing to help the music except overpower it", finishing off with "for all its good points, the escalating and descending keyboards and the hollow, spooky atmosphere it creates, TGPC is far from perfect."

Track listing

References

External links 

 
 The Grand Psychotic Castle at Encyclopaedia Metallum

1997 debut albums
Necropolis Records albums
Joachim Rygg albums